Major General James Kazini (1957–2009) was a Ugandan army officer who served as commander of the Uganda People's Defense Force from 2001 to 2003.

History
He was born in 1957 in the Basongora ethnic group, in Kasese District, in Western Region of Uganda. He did not attain much formal education. Prior to 1984, Kazini was a member of the Uganda National Rescue Front, a rebel group then headed by General Moses Ali, which was based in West Nile, in northwestern Uganda. Around 1984 he left that group and joined the National Resistance Army, headed by Yoweri Museveni, as an enlisted soldier.

He went on to become one of Salim Saleh's body guards. He became a commissioned officer at the rank of Captain in 1987, Major in 1989 and Lieutenant Colonel in 1991.

Interdiction
In December 2003, President Yoweri Museveni, the Commander in Chief of the UPDF, committed Kazini and a dozen senior officers to the General Court Martial on various charges, especially creation and maintenance of "ghost" soldiers on the army payroll. Others included Brigadier Nakibus Lakara (former chief of staff), Brigadier Henry Tumukunde (former director general of the Internal Security Organization) and Brigadier Andrew Gutti, who was later pardoned and promoted.

On 27 March 2008, when the General Court Martial under Lieutenant General Ivan Koreta sentenced him to three years in jail for causing financial loss of Shs60 million (approximately US$30,000), Kazini wept. Kazini and others, still on trial, allegedly maintained 24,000 fictitious names on the army payroll which resulted in loss of Shs600 billion (approximately US$300 million) over 13 years.

He later challenged the sentence in the Constitutional Court, arguing that the Court Martial had no jurisdiction to hear the case, but he lost the appeal. He lodged an appeal in the Supreme Court and the case was due for hearing.

Military leadership
One of the attributes that served him well on his rise to the top in the UPDF was his reputation as a fearless soldier, often personally leading his soldiers into battle on the front-lines, as he did during Operation Kitona in the Second Congo War. The other attribute was his total commitment to the commander in chief and the UPDF. Museveni is reported to have repeatedly ignored complaints about Kazini's limited formal education. Over the years, he repeatedly promoted him and gave him increasing security and defence responsibilities.

Death
On the morning of 10 November 2009, sometime around 6AM local time, Major General James Kazini died at the home of his girlfriend, in the Kampala suburb of Namuwongo, after being struck on the head with a metal pipe during a domestic brawl. At the time of his death James Kazini was 52 years old.

His alleged killer, 28-year-old Lydia Draru, who also goes by several different aliases, was arrested, presented before a magistrate and remanded to jail, pending trial for capital murder. Kazini left behind five children, four daughters and one son, with two different women. His alleged killer did not have a child with him. 

Lydia Draru was tried and convicted of murder. In 2011, she was sentenced to fourteen years in prison. She served her sentence at Luzira Maximum Security Prison. She was released from prison on 12 January 2021. Two years were subtracted from her sentence on account of her good conduct while in prison. The two years she spent in jail, while on trial was counted as part of her sentence.

See also
 Salim Saleh
 Elly Tumwine
 Mugisha Muntu
 Jeje Odongo

References

External links
General Kazini Killed During Domestic Brawl
 Lydia Dralu's Account of Events Leading to Kazini's Death
 Was Kazini plotting against Museveni?

1957 births
2009 deaths
People from Kasese District
Ugandan military personnel
Ituri conflict
Ugandan generals